Edward Toomy (ca 1809 – December 25, 1859) was a merchant and political figure in Lower Canada. He represented Drummond in the Legislative Assembly of Lower Canada from 1833 to 1838. His surname also appears as Toomey.

Toomy was a merchant in Drummondville, Quebec. He was first elected to the legislative assembly in an 1833 by-election held after Frederick Heriot resigned his seat. He voted for the Ninety-Two Resolutions. Toomy married Catherine Clarke. He was named bailiff for the Superior Court in 1851. He died in Drummondville at the age of 50.

References 

1859 deaths
Members of the Legislative Assembly of Lower Canada
Year of birth uncertain